Gideon S. Case (June 13, 1847 - February 6, 1931) was an American soldier and politician who served in the California State Assembly for the 67th district from 1907 to 1909.

During the American Civil War, Case served in the Union Army.

References

External links

1847 births
1931 deaths
Union Army soldiers
20th-century American politicians
Republican Party members of the California State Assembly
People from Chagrin Falls, Ohio